September is a 2003 German drama film directed by Max Färberböck. It was screened in the Un Certain Regard section at the 2003 Cannes Film Festival. The subject matter is the effect of the September 11 attacks.

Plot
The film takes place in Germany, shortly after the September 11 attacks. Eight individuals of different backgrounds react to the attacks with conflicting emotions and unpredictable behavior. The events have affected their personal lives.

Cast
 Catharina Schuchmann as Julia
 Justus von Dohnanyi as Philipp Scholz
 Nina Proll as Lena
 Jörg Schüttauf as Helmer
 Moritz Rinke as Baumberger
 Sólveig Arnarsdóttir as Susanne
 Stefanie Stappenbeck as Natascha
 Rene David Ifrah as Ashraf (as René Ifrah)
 Anja Kling as Sandra
 Vincent Heppner as Robert
 Aiko Pipo as Patrick

References

External links

2003 films
2003 drama films
2000s German-language films
Films based on the September 11 attacks
Films directed by Max Färberböck
Films scored by Dario Marianelli
Films set in Germany
German drama films
2000s German films